The following is a list of notable events and releases that happened in 2010 in music in South Korea.

Debuting and disbanded in 2010

Debuting groups

...Whatever That Means
The Boss
CNBLUE
Coed School
DMTN
Eastern Sidekick
F.Cuz
GD & TOP
Girl's Day
GP Basic
Idiotape
Infinite
JYJ
Led Apple
Miss A
Nine Muses
One Way
Orange Caramel
Raspberry Field
Rooftop Moonlight
Rhythm Power
Standing Egg
Sistar
Teen Top
The Boss
The Koxx
Touch
ZE:A

Solo debuts

The Black Skirts
Cha Cha Malone
Choi Jung-in
Chun Myung-hoon
Crucial Star
Gilme
Huh Gak
Hyuna
Jay Park
John Park
JeA
Kim Junsu
Okasian
Rumble Fish
Soy Kim
Swings
Yun Seok-cheol

Disbanded groups
Rumble Fish
Tin Tin Five
Uptown

Releases in 2010

First quarter

January

February

March

Second quarter

April

May

June

Third quarter

July

August

September

Fourth quarter

October

November

December

Deaths
Park Yong-ha, 32, actor and singer
Choi Jin-young, 39, actor and singer

See also
2010 in South Korea
List of South Korean films of 2010

References 

 
South Korean music
K-pop